WLEK-LD, virtual channel 22 (UHF digital channel 31), is a low-powered Rewind TV television station licensed to Concord, New Hampshire, United States. The station is owned by DTV America Corporation. It mainly serves the northern portion of the Boston, Massachusetts media market. The station's transmitter is located in Peabody, Massachusetts.

History
WLEK-LD officially signed on the air in late 2016, four years after the FCC granted the station its broadcasting license. Before its current Azteca América affiliation (as of 2020), the station was affiliated with DTV America's upstart healthy lifestyle-oriented network the Doctor Television Channel, which ceased operations in 2019. Azteca America would also cease operations in 2022, leaving WLEK-LD to change affiliates with Rewind TV.

Digital channels
The station's digital signal is multiplexed:

References

External links

Innovate Corp.
LEK-LD
Television channels and stations established in 2015
Low-power television stations in the United States
2015 establishments in New Hampshire